The Vernon Building Society is a building society based in Stockport, England. It is a member of the Building Societies Association.

References

External links
Vernon Building Society

Building societies of England
Banks established in 1924
Organizations established in 1924
Companies based in Stockport
1924 establishments in England